The World Evangelical Congregational Fellowship (WECF) is a global association of evangelical Christian Congregational Churches, from various national associations around the world, which is united by a common belief in the lordship of Jesus Christ and the authority of the Bible, as well as by its common desire for evangelism.

Origins 
The idea for the WECF began at a series of annual meetings of the Conservative Congregational Christian Conference in 1983, when a number of international delegates at the American meetings expressed an interest in solidifying relationships with other evangelical congregationalists across the globe. A constitutional framework for the Fellowship was ultimately agreed upon, and the WECF held its inaugural assembly in October 1986, in Sussex, England.

Statistics
According to a denomination census released in 2020, it has 18 denominations members in 17 countries.

Organization 
The WECF is overseen by a number of executive officers from different nations: including a President, Vice-President, Treasurer, Secretary, and several members-at-large. It presently meets triennially, with a smaller-scale mid-term meeting, every year and a half.

Members 
List of WECF Members

 Evangelical Congregational Churches, Argentina
 Fellowship of Congregational Churches, Australia
 Alliance of Evangelical Congregational Churches, Brazil
 Union of Evangelical Congregational Churches, Brazil
 Union of Congregational Churches, Bulgaria
 Congregational Christian Churches, Canada
 Evangelical Churches Association (Congregational), Manipur, India
 Evangelsko-Kongresanska Crkva Skopje, Republic of Macedonia
 Chuuk Congregational Church of Christ, Federated States of Micronesia
 Evangelical Churches Association, Myanmar
 Evangelical Congregational Churches, Nepal
 Congregational Union of New Zealand
 Congregational Union of Northern Ireland
 National Association of Congregational Churches, Philippines
 Union of Congregational Churches, Portugal
 Evangelical Fellowship of Congregational Churches, Republic of South Africa
 Evangelical Fellowship of Congregational Churches, United Kingdom
 Conservative Congregational Christian Conference, United States of America

Associate Member

 UCC (Pohnpei) Congregational Churches on Guam and Saipan

References

External links 
 

Evangelical organizations established in the 20th century
Christian organizations established in 1986
International Christian organizations